Nuussuaq Peninsula (old spelling Nûgssuaq or simply Nugsuak) is a mainland peninsula in northwestern Greenland, located at the northern end of Upernavik Archipelago, approximately  to the south of Melville Bay. It is much smaller than its namesake in western Greenland.

Geography 

The peninsula has a southwest–northwest orientation, jutting into Baffin Bay to the southwest, separating the Nuussuup Kangia fjord in the southeast from the Inussulik Bay in the northwest.

It is very mountainous, culminating in two  peaks in its central part. The mountain tops at the spine of the peninsula are partially glaciated, with the Sermikassaq mountain glacier flowing to the north from the highest point.

While the small bay near the Nuussuaq settlement provides a sheltered harbour, the remainder of the southeastern coastline is not developed. There are several fjords on the northwestern shore, from Qasigialissuaq in the southwest, to Qasigiassuit and much larger Kangerluarsuk in the northeast. The latter separates the peninsula from Illulissuaq Peninsula, a smaller peninsula branching off Nuussuaq Peninsula west of its base. The only island of any size in Inussulik Bay off the northern coast is the flooded mountain of Illoorfik Island.

Settlement 

Tourism 
There are several trails across the peninsula, but the mountainous interior is limited to mountaineering. Tourism in the region is very undeveloped, and there are no facilities. The coastline of the peninsula can be explored by chartering the boats of the local seal hunters.

References 

Inussulik Bay
Sugar Loaf Bay
Peninsulas of the Upernavik Archipelago